Khwarshi may refer to:
 Khwarshi people: A people of the Caucasus in southwestern Dagestan, Russia
 Khwarshi language: The Tsezic language spoken by the Khwarshi people